Pish posh may refer to:
 Pish Posh, a 2006 children's novel by American author Ellen Potter
 A catchphrase in Noddy (TV series)
 A song by the American band Paria from the 2009 album The Barnacle Cordious
 A book in the Serendipity book series